Po Tsui Park is a public park between the communities of Po Lam and Tseung Kwan O Village in New Territories, Hong Kong.

References

External links
 Po Tsui Park Official Page

Urban public parks and gardens in Hong Kong
Sai Kung District